Garren is an American hairstylist.

Garren may also refer to:

People
Garren Stitt (born 2003), American actor and singer
Don Garren (1933–2018), American politician from North Carolina
Zachary Garren, American guitarist formerly of Dance Gavin Dance and now a member of Strawberry Girls

Geography
Garren Brook, a river in England
Garrensee, a lake in Germany
NGC 604, also known as the Garren Nebula